The 1953 Labour Party deputy leadership election took place on 29 October	1953, after sitting deputy leader Herbert Morrison was challenged by Aneurin Bevan.

Candidates
 Herbert Morrison, incumbent Deputy Leader, Member of Parliament for Lewisham South
 Aneurin Bevan, former Minister of Labour and National Service, Member of Parliament for Ebbw Vale

Results

Sources
http://privatewww.essex.ac.uk/~tquinn/labour_party_deputy.htm 

1953
1953 elections in the United Kingdom
Labour Party deputy leadership election